Allen Chapel AME Church is a historic church at the corner of First Street and Elm Street in Fort Worth, Texas.  It was listed on the National Register of Historic Places in 1984.

History 

The Tudor Gothic Revival building was designed by noted African-American architect William Sidney Pittman, son-in-law of Booker T. Washington. When the church was completed in 1914, it sat 1,350 people. It was named after Richard Allen, a former slave and African-American minister who was the first bishop of the African-American Methodist Episcopal Church.  Built at a cost of $20,000 it is the oldest and largest African Methodist Episcopal church in Fort Worth. The church established the first private schools for African-Americans. A pipe organ was installed in 1923. In 2011 lightning hit the church's bell tower causing extensive damage.

Photo gallery

See also 
 National Register of Historic Places listings in Tarrant County, Texas

References

Further reading

African Methodist Episcopal churches in Texas
National Register of Historic Places in Fort Worth, Texas
Gothic Revival church buildings in Texas
Churches completed in 1914
Churches in Fort Worth, Texas
Churches on the National Register of Historic Places in Texas
Recorded Texas Historic Landmarks